Electro-industrial is a music genre that emerged from industrial music in the early 1980s. While EBM (electronic body music) has a minimal structure and clean production, electro-industrial tends to have a grittier, complex and layered sound with a more experimental approach. The style was pioneered by Skinny Puppy, Front Line Assembly, Numb, and other groups, either from Canada or the Benelux. In the early 1990s, the style spawned the dark electro genre, and in the mid-/late-1990s, the aggrotech offshoot. The fan base for the style is linked to the rivethead subculture.

Characteristics 
After the EBM movement faded in the early 1990s, electro-industrial increasingly attained popularity in the international club scene. In contrast to the straight EBM style, electro-industrial groups use harsher beats and raspy, distorted, or digitized vocals. In contrast to industrial rock, electro-industrial groups mostly avoided guitars, other than Skinny Puppy, who used electric guitar elements since the mid-'80s in songs like "Testure" or "Dig It", and Numb on songs like "God Is Dead".

Electro-industrial was anticipated by 1980s groups such as SPK, Die Form, Borghesia, Klinik, Skinny Puppy, Numb, and Front Line Assembly.

Prominent electro-industrial groups of the 1990s include Mentallo and the Fixer, Yeht Mae, Velvet Acid Christ, and Pulse Legion (U.S.); Numb and Decoded Feedback (Canada); X Marks the Pedwalk, Plastic Noise Experience, Wumpscut, Haujobb, Forma Tadre, KMFDM, Putrefy Factor 7, and Abortive Gasp (Germany); Leæther Strip (Denmark); and early Hocico, Cenobita, and Amduscia (Mexico).

Since the mid-1990s, some electro-industrial groups added guitars and became associated with industrial metal; other groups, e. g. Skinny Puppy, Download, Gridlock, and Haujobb, have incorporated elements of experimental electronic music styles like drum and bass, IDM, glitch, and other electronica genres.

Conceptual elements 
Electro-industrial groups tend to feature themes of control, dystopia, and science fiction. Electro-industrial groups sometimes take aesthetic inspiration from horror films, including The Exorcist and the work of Roman Polanski,  and the science fiction films Blade Runner and Alien.

Derivatives

Dark electro 
Dark electro is a similar style, developed in the early 1990s in central Europe. The term describes groups such as yelworC and Placebo Effect, and was first used in December 1992 with the album announcement of Brainstorming, yelworC's debut. The style was inspired by the music of The Klinik and Skinny Puppy. Compositions included gothic horror soundscapes, occult themes, and grunts or distorted vocals. yelworC were a music group from Munich, formed in 1988. They laid the foundations of the dark electro movement in the early 1990s, and were the first artist on the German label Celtic Circle Productions. In subsequent years, dark electro was displaced by techno-influenced styles such as aggrotech and futurepop.  Other groups to practice the style included amGod, Trial, early Evil's Toy, Mortal Constraint, Arcana Obscura, Splatter Squall, Seven Trees, Tri-State, and Ice Ages.

Aggrotech 

Aggrotech (also known as Terror EBM and hellektro) is a derivative form of dark-electro with a strong influence from industrial hardcore (straight techno bassdrum from Roland TR-909 and oscillator sounds, especially Supersaw leads from Roland JP-8000) that first surfaced in the mid-late-1990s. 

Aggrotech typically employs aggressive beats, prominent lead synth lines, and lyrics of a dark nature.  Often, vocals are distorted and pitch-shifted to sound harsh and synthetic; static and glitching effects are also added. Aggrotech musicians include Agonoize, Alien Vampires, Amduscia, Bestias De Asalto, Cenobita, Chiasm, Die Sektor, Combichrist, Dawn of Ashes, Detroit Diesel, Dulce Liquido, DYM, Feindflug, God Module, Grendel, Hocico, iVardensphere, Nachtmahr, Machine Sonata, Panic Lift, Psyclon Nine, Reaper, Suicide Commando, Tactical Sekt, Tamtrum, The Retrosic, Ritual Aesthetic, Unter Null, Virtual Embrace, and X-Fusion, among many.

See also 

List of industrial music festivals
List of electro-industrial bands

References 

 
Industrial music
Electronic music genres

de:Electro (Sammelbezeichnung)#Electro-Industrial